"Where the Dead Ships Dwell" is a song by Swedish heavy metal band In Flames. It was released as the second single from the band's tenth studio album, Sounds of a Playground Fading. The song is one of the band's most successful singles in the US, peaking at no. 33 on the Billboard Active Rock chart.

Music video
The song's music video was directed by Patric Ullaeus.

The video features several shots of grainy footage and is centered on a woman who wonders around a forest, a ship yard, and a rock pit. There are also shots of a figure dressed in all black, someone dressed as the Jester Head, and an old man with a rapidly moving eye.

Track listing
CD single

Promo single

Charts

Personnel
In Flames
Anders Fridén – vocals
Björn Gelotte – guitars
Peter Iwers – bass
Daniel Svensson – drums

Additional
Örjan Örnkloo – keyboards

References

2011 songs
2011 singles
In Flames songs
Century Media Records singles